Marsel Markulin (29 October 1936 – 1 April 2009) was a Croatian gymnast. He competed in eight events at the 1960 Summer Olympics.

References

1936 births
2009 deaths
Croatian male artistic gymnasts
Olympic gymnasts of Yugoslavia
Gymnasts at the 1960 Summer Olympics
Sportspeople from Zagreb
20th-century Croatian people